Mamadou Sylla (born 22 February 1986) is a Senegalese footballer who last plays as a defender for ASC Jaraaf. He has been capped once for Senegal.

References

External links
 
 

1986 births
Living people
Footballers from Dakar
Senegalese footballers
Senegal international footballers
ASC Jaraaf players
Senegalese expatriate footballers
Expatriate footballers in Lebanon
Senegalese expatriate sportspeople in Lebanon
Association football defenders
Al Shabab Al Arabi Club Beirut players
AC Tripoli players
Lebanese Premier League players